The 2011 Scotties Tournament of Hearts, the Canadian women's national curling championship, was held from February 19 to February 27 at the Charlottetown Civic Centre in Charlottetown, Prince Edward Island. It was the 30th anniversary of Kruger Products sponsoring the tournament and the first time a Bronze Medal Game was added to the playoffs.

Teams
The defending champions of team Jennifer Jones, are looking to win their fifth Scotties Championship. This will be the first Scotties appearance for the Jones' new third Kaitlyn Lawes, who was added to the team after Jones and crew parted ways with longtime third Cathy Overton-Clapham. After being kicked out of her old squad by the Jones team, Overton-Clapham announced that she hoped to once again return to the Scotties with a new team.  After forming a new team, Overton-Clapham won the Manitoba Provincials. She will be making her skipping debut at this year's Scotties, with the goal of winning her record-tying sixth Scotties Championship.

Looking to take home their province's first Scotties Championship, Suzanne Birt (Gaudet) defeated last year's Scotties runner up Kathy O'Rourke in the provincial playdowns and, for the sixth time, will be representing Prince Edward Island at home in Charlottetown. Kelly Scott is another former Scotties champion who is looking to take home third title, and will once again represent British Columbia. After losing the 2008 Scotties Tournament of Hearts to Jennifer Jones, Shannon Kleibrink will make her fourth Scotties appearance representing Alberta.

Amber Holland and her team from Kronau are making their second appearance as Team Saskatchewan, and looking to improve last year's record  of 6–5. Making her sixth appearance in seven years, Kerry Galusha will be once again representing Yukon/Northwest Territories. The last two Scotties have seen Galusha's team in 2009 and Sharon Cormier in 2010 defeat defending champions Jennifer Jones in round robin play. This year they look to advance to the playoffs.  Canadian junior champion Rachel Homan will be making her debut as skip, representing Ontario after defeating defending provincial champion Krista McCarville in the Ontario finals. Alongside Homan is former Canadian junior champion Stacie Devereaux who will represent Newfoundland and Labrador, making her skipping debut at the Scotties.

Making her fifth appearance as team New Brunswick is Andrea Kelly; she is looking to improve her record and is looking to win her first Scotties title. Heather Smith-Dacey will make her second appearance as skip at this year's Tournament of Hearts, representing Nova Scotia. Smith-Dacey and team pulled together when their skip, six time Scotties Champion, Colleen Jones, was hospitalized with meningitis. They managed to pull through and win their provincial title. Quebec was the last province to qualify. Six time provincial champion Marie-France Larouche defeated two time provincial champion Chantal Osborne. In her last four Scotties appearances, Larouche has made it to the playoffs but has been unsuccessful in winning a national title. This year Larouche is looking to take the title home.

10 of the 12 skips are previous Canadian Junior Champions. Overton-Clapham won in 1989, Smith-Dacey in 1991, Holland in 1992, Jones in 1994, Scott in 1995, Larouche in 1999, Birt in 2001 & 2002, Kelly in 2005, Devereaux in 2007 and Homan in 2010. Only Kleibrink and Galusha have not previously won a Junior title. Had Kleibrink lost to 1996 champion Heather Nedohin in the Alberta final, it would have been 11 teams.

{| border=1 cellpadding=5 cellspacing=0
|-
!bgcolor="#FF0000" width="250"| 
!bgcolor="#0000CD" width="250"| 
!bgcolor="#0099FF" width="250"| British Columbia
|- align=center
|align=left|St. Vital CC, Winnipeg
Skip:  Jennifer Jones
Third:  Kaitlyn Lawes
Second:  Jill Officer
Lead: Dawn Askin
Alternate: Janet Arnott
|align=left|Calgary WC, Calgary
Skip:  Shannon Kleibrink
Third:  Amy Nixon
Second:  Bronwen Webster
Lead: Chelsey Bell
Alternate: Crystal Webster
|align=left|Kelowna CC, Kelowna
Skip: Kelly Scott
Third: Jeanna Schraeder
Second: Sasha Carter
Lead: Jacquie Armstrong
Alternate: Shannon Aleksic
|- border=1 cellpadding=5 cellspacing=0
!bgcolor="#FFFF99" width="250"| Manitoba
!bgcolor="#FFD700" width="250"| New Brunswick
!bgcolor="#DC143C" width="250"| 
|- align=center
|align=left| Fort Rouge CC, Winnipeg
Skip: Cathy Overton-Clapham
Third: Karen Fallis
Second: Leslie Wilson
Lead: Raunora Westcott
Alternate: Breanne Meakin
|align=left| Fredericton CC, Fredericton
Skip: Andrea Kelly
Third: Denise Nowlan
Second: Jillian Babin
Lead: Lianne Sobey
Alternate: Jodie DeSolla
|align=left| Bally Haly G&CC, St. John's
Skip: Stacie Devereaux
Third: Stephanie Guzzwell
Second: Sarah Paul
Lead: Heather Martin
Alternate: Julie Devereaux
|- border=1 cellpadding=5 cellspacing=0
!bgcolor="#000080" width="250"| 
!bgcolor="#B22222" width="250"| 
!bgcolor="#006400" width="250"| 
|- align=center
|align=left| Mayflower CC, Halifax
Skip: Heather Smith-Dacey
Third: Danielle Parsons
Second: Blisse Comstock
Lead: Teri Lake
Alternate: Melanie Comstock
|align=left| Ottawa CC, Ottawa
Skip: Rachel Homan
Third: Emma Miskew
Second: Alison Kreviazuk
Lead: Lisa Weagle
Alternate: Sherry Middaugh
|align=left|Charlottetown CC, Charlottetown
Skip: Suzanne Birt
Third: Shelly Bradley
Second: Robyn MacPhee
Lead: Leslie MacDougall
Alternate: Tricia Affleck
|- border=1 cellpadding=5 cellspacing=0
!bgcolor="#00FFFF" width="250"| Quebec
!bgcolor="#32CD32" width="250"| Saskatchewan
!bgcolor="#A9A9A9" width="250"| Northwest Territories/Yukon
|- align=center
|align=left|CC Etchemin, Saint-RomualdSkip: Marie-France Larouche
Third: Annie Lemay
Second: Véronique Grégoire
Lead: Véronique Brassard
Alternate: Joëlle Sabourin|align=left| Kronau CC, KronauSkip: Amber Holland
Third: Kim Schneider
Second: Tammy Schneider
Lead: Heather Kalenchuk
Alternate: Jolene Campbell|align=left| Yellowknife CC, YellowknifeSkip: Kerry Galusha
Third: Dawn Moses
Second: Wendy Miller
Lead: Shona Barbour
Alternate: Sharon Cormier|}

Round robin standingsFinal Round Robin StandingsResultsAll times local (Atlantic Time Zone, AT)Draw 1February 19, 2:30 PM AT Draw 2February 19, 7:30 PM ATDraw 3February 20, 9:30 AM ATDraw 4February 20, 2:30 PM ATDraw 5February 20, 7:30 PM ATDraw 6February 21, 9:30 AM ATDraw 7February 21, 2:30 PM ATDraw 8February 21, 7:30 PM ATDraw 9February 22, 9:30 AM ATDraw 10February 22, 2:30 PM ATDraw 11February 22, 7:30 PM ATDraw 12February 23, 9:30 AM ATDraw 13February 23, 2:30 PM ATDraw 14February 23, 7:30 PM ATDraw 15February 24, 9:30 AM ATDraw 16February 24, 2:30 PM ATDraw 17February 24, 7:30 PM ATTiebreaker February 25, 2:30 PM ATPlayoffs

1 vs. 2February 25, 7:30 PM AT3 vs. 4February 26, 12:00 PM ATSemi-finalFebruary 26, 5:00 PM ATBronze-medal gameFebruary 27, 2:30 PM ATFinalFebruary 27, 7:30 PM ATFirst end

By virtue of winning the 1 vs. 2 game, Jennifer Jones would start the game with hammer, and they had the right to choose the colour of stones. Jones picked red, giving Saskatchewan yellow. On Jones' first rock, she makes a double take out to sit two. Amber Holland attempts a freeze on the shot rock, but ends up rolling off of it into the open. This allows Jones the opportunity to hit it, which she does, sticking her rock and scoring three.

Second end

Kim Schneider splits a Saskatchewan rock biting the house in, to sit two. Saskatchewan remains sitting two when Jones on her last rock of the end hits one and rolls out. Holland draws for her second point.

Third end

Saskatchewan puts on the pressure without the hammer in the third end. On her last stone, Holland hits a Canada rock to sit three. Jones must draw to the full eight against three Saskatchewan stones to score a point, and is successful.

Fourth end

On her last stone, Saskatchewan's Tammy Schneider makes a fluke double raise which promotes a Saskatchewan rock to the button. Jones plays the end to force Saskatchewan to the one point by playing guards. After Canada's Kaitlyn Lawes puts a second Canada stone frozen on to Saskatchewan's shot rock, the Saskatchewan team also opts to guard. On her last rock, Jones attempts a raise on her own onto the frozen rock, but it hits too little of it. Amber Holland has no shot for a second point, and opts to throw her final shot through the rings.

Fifth end

After Kim Schneider rolls out on her second shot hit, Kaitlyn Lawes responds by hitting it a sitting two for Canada. Holland's final shot is a long double, which she jams leaving Canada sitting one. Jennifer Jones draws to an open house for her second point.

Sixth end

On her final shot, Kim Schneider makes a nice draw around a corner guard. Jones then attempts to freeze on it, but wrecks on the guard, barely moving it. Holland then draws around it to sit two. Jones then decides to draw around her own stone sitting in the top 12 ft, but it is a tad heavy and ends up in the back 4 ft. Amber Holland navigates through a port with soft weight, bumping it out to score three.

Seventh end

On her final shot, Amber Holland's hit to sit two, ends up rolling out, and therefore only sits one. Opting for a better shot at a deuce with hammer in the eighth, Jones peels out the Saskatchewan shot rock to blank the end.

Eighth end

On her first rock, Jennifer Jones draws to the button behind cover to sit one. In an attempt to force Jones to a sole point, Amber Holland attempts a freeze on to the shot rock to narrow the scoring area. However, her stone corner freezes to shot rock, leaving it open, and giving Jones an intricate shot for two or three. Jones hits the Saskatchewan stone at the wrong angle, and only takes the one.

Ninth end

On her first shot, Amber Holland's attempt at a come around behind a guard sticks out a bit, giving Jennifer Jones just enough of the rock to hit. This has Canada sitting one. Holland draws for a single point, tying the game going into the last end without hammer.

Tenth end

In hopes of stealing a victory, Amber Holland opts to utilize the four rock rule, by having lead Heather Kalenchuk place a high centre line guard on her first rock. Jones responds by having lead Dawn Askin throw a rock in the rings to have the possible winning point. Holland calls for Kalenchuk to throw a tight guard to utilize the four rock rule once again, but she is heavy and it lands in the 12 ft, in front of Askin's rock. This gives Canada the permission to remove it, which Jones asks Askin to do. However, Askin flashes her stone, missing everything entirely. Tammy Schneider then places a tight guard for Saskatchewan. At this point, Canada can start removing guards, and Jill Officer can now remove the high guard, which she peels off. Tammy Schneider then replaces it, and it is once again removed by Officer. Kim Schneider then puts up another high centre line guard, but it is removed Kaitlyn Lawes. Kim Schneider on her second rock comes a bit heavy, ending up as a halfway guard. Jones opts to have Lawes remove it as well. At this point, Amber Holland decides to make her move by coming around the tight guard placed by Tammy Schneider. Her rock has good weight, but it is too far outside, and the entire rock is visible for Jennifer Jones to remove, and even roll in for shot. Jones does remove the stone, but instead rolls out to the 12 ft. On her final stone, Holland makes a perfect come around, landing on the button. This leaves Jones with a double run back on to it for the win. Jones almost makes the shot, but the Canada rock rolls further than the Saskatchewan rock, giving the title to Saskatchewan for the first time since 1997.

Top 5 Player percentages

Awards
Sandra Schmirler Most Valuable Player Award
  Amber Holland, Saskatchewan 

Shot of the Week Award
  Amber Holland, Saskatchewan 

Marj Mitchell Sportsmanship Award
  Cathy Overton-Clapham, Manitoba

All-Star TeamsFirst Team Skip:  Jennifer Jones, Team Canada
 Third:  Kaitlyn Lawes, Team Canada
 Second:  Jill Officer, Team Canada
 Lead:  Dawn Askin, Team CanadaSecond Team''
 Skip:  Amber Holland, Saskatchewan
 Third:  Kim Schneider, Saskatchewan
 Second:  Tammy Schneider, Saskatchewan
 Lead:  Heather Kalenchuk, Saskatchewan

Notes

References

External links
 Scotties Home Page

 
Scotties Tournament of Hearts
Scotties Tournament Of Hearts, 2011
Curling competitions in Charlottetown
Scotties Tournament Of Hearts
Scotties Tournament of Hearts
Scotties Tournament of Hearts